Jordi Muñoz Abreu (born 17 January 1990) is a Spanish-Venezuelan tennis player.

Muñoz Abreu has a career high ATP singles ranking of 659 achieved on 20 October 2014. He also has a career high ATP doubles ranking of 291 achieved on 14 November 2016.

Muñoz Abreu has represented Venezuela at the Davis Cup where he has a W/L record of 4–6.

External links

1990 births
Living people
Venezuelan male tennis players
Spanish male tennis players
Tennis players from Barcelona
Tennis players from Catalonia